Shur Ab (also Romanized as Shūr Āb and Shūrāb; also known as Sharāb Pāīn) is a village in Siyakh Darengun Rural District, in the Central District of Shiraz County, Fars Province, Iran. At the 2006 census, its population was 419, in 96 families.

References 

Populated places in Shiraz County